Keith White (born 27 August 1958) is a former international speedway rider in the United Kingdom, who represented England at test level.

His father Vic White rode and was often Keith's team manager throughout his career.

Career
White started his career with the Peterborough Panthers in the National League but started to show his promise whilst at the Crewe Kings. His form prompted the Leicester Lions to call on his services up in the British League. He was then signed on a full contract by the Hackney Hawks to ride full-time in the top flight in 1976.

After four seasons with Hackney, in the last of which he won the London Riders' Championship, he moved on to the Coventry Bees as well as riding for the Milton Keynes Knights in the National League. He retired in 1990 after a poor start to the season (due to injuries) with the Long Eaton Invaders.

References

External Links
 https://wwosbackup.proboards.com/thread/3062 

1958 births
Living people
British speedway riders
English motorcycle racers
Sportspeople from Chelmsford
Peterborough Panthers riders
Crewe Kings riders
Leicester Lions riders
Long Eaton Invaders riders
Hackney Hawks riders
Coventry Bees riders
Birmingham Brummies riders
Milton Keynes Knights riders
Poole Pirates riders
People from Hackney Central